In South Korea, there are roughly 20.5 million Christians of whom 15 million are Protestants; of those some 9 to 10 million are Presbyterians. Presbyterians in South Korea worship in over 100 different Presbyterian denominational churches who trace their history back to the United Presbyterian Assembly.

History of Protestantism in Korea 
In the past, Christianity in Asia was not very common. Of Asian countries, Korea had the most Christians. As Korean Protestantism began with the Western missionaries to Korea, the majority were American Presbyterian and Methodist. Protestantism was introduced to Korea in the late 19th century through missionaries. Lay people like Seo Sang-ryun and Baek Hong-Joon spread their knowledge of the Gospels after their conversion, and Christianity, of which the Catholic form had been suppressed in the middle of the 19th century, began to grow again in Korea.

Protestant missionaries in Korea

In 1884, Seo founded the first Protestant Christian community in Korea. The following year, the first American Protestant missionary and physician, Horace N. Allen of the Northern Presbyterians, arrived in Korea, and began medical work in 1885. Horace G. Underwood, a fellow Northern Presbyterian missionary, later joined this effort. His efforts were to "Christianize" the Koreans. Many people witnessed the extraordinary expansion of Protestant Christianity thanks to the early missionary method. Park (1992) states how the Nevius Plan and indirect missionary programs such as educational, medical, and social services. The indirect missionary method was effective because most Koreans in the beginning were apprehensive and hostile toward the Westerners to include missionaries. Through indirect programs, early missionaries slowly diminished the hostility and distrust of natives. The missionaries could communicate and sometimes convert Koreans. Clearly, the indirect missionary method worked well enough since small Protestant churches arose.

The Presbyterian Church of Victoria began mission work in 1889, followed in 1892 by the Southern Presbyterians, and in 1898 by the Presbyterian Church in Canada. Together they formed the Council of Mission of Presbyterian Churches and in 1901 opened the Pyongyang Theological Seminary in Pyongyang.

In 1907, the Independent Presbytery of Jesus Christ was formed, and seven Korean pastors were ordained. In 1921 the general assembly of the Presbyterian Church of Chosun was formed and sent seven missionaries to China.

During and even somewhat before the Japanese occupation, churches from practically all Christian denominations faced many hardships and were actively persecuted by the Japanese administration. The imposition of Shinto rites of worship further exacerbated religious persecution during the occupation. While South Korea was under rule of Japan at the time, they decided to open up their “personal boundaries” to other countries, such as the United States, who were responsible for introducing Protestantism to Korea. During this era, South Korea was mostly practicing Buddhism.Many Presbyterians were among those who resisted and fought for Korean independence. Following the conclusion the Second World War, the withdrawal of Japan, and the partitioning of Korea, Presbyterian churches in the communist-leaning northern parts of Korea were dissolved. In the Syngman Rhee-led parts of Korea south of the 38th Parallel they were reconstructed in 1946. The 33rd general assembly of the Presbyterian Church of Chosun was held in 1947. Two years later the name "Presbyterian Church in Korea" was adopted. The Christianity movement expanded rapidly after the Korean War. People needed hope after such destruction and annihilation, many turned towards religion to keep hope alive.

Korean Protestant Churches 
To be considered Protestant, Baker (2016) defines “those who confessed belief in a specific Protestant creed, and they were expected to meet regularly for worship services in a Protestant church”.  Protestants gave more credit to women for institutional roles in the church, much farther than Catholics have. Also assigning women titles such as exhorter and deaconess. In 1989 there were nearly 30,000 protestant churches. In the same time there were nearly one fourth of South Korea’s 40 million people were protestant Christian. No less than 25 percent of the population in South Korea is now Protestant Christian. Currently, Protestant churches are to be found in nearly all of the larger villages, also the towns and cities. Seoul is filled with so many church buildings and signs of the cross, that it has been called "a city of churches." In 2011, according to the Ministry of Culture, Sports and Tourism there were almost 78,000 Protestant churches in Korea. South Korea has the world’s largest church congregation at the Yoido Full Gospel Church.

The following year saw significant growth for the Presbyterian church in Korea. Among the reasons contributing to the growth in size of Christian communities in Korea was the fact that unlike in other countries, Christianity was not associated with colonial or imperialist power. The Protestant Christian message came to Korea at a time when the religious and cultural heritage of the country had lost much of its strength and relevance for the common people. In addition to being unencumbered by imperialist or colonial connotations, the Christian communities themselves contributed to their own growth. Presbyterian churches adopted what was called the "Möbius method" in which each new convert was strongly encouraged to become an evangelist and convert others, and much like the Möbius strip this practice is intended to make Christianity in Korea boundless. Together with the post-World War II revival movement, these factors contributed greatly to the immense growth of Christianity in Korea in the decades since.

Eventually, Korean Christians established their own churches not just in Korea but in other parts of the world; Korea is second only to the United States in the number of missionaries sent abroad. Several thousand Korean Presbyterian missionaries are active in many other countries.

Growth, however, was not free of turmoil, but accompanied by schisms. After World War II but before the end of the Korean War the Presbyterian Church in Korea (고신, Go-shin) and the Presbyterian Church in Korea (재건, Jae-gun) were formed. A few years later the conservative and progressive parts of the Presbyterian Church separated. As a result, in the last major Presbyterian schism, the Presbyterian Church in Korea (통합, Tong-hap) and the Presbyterian Church in Korea (합동, Hap-dong) were formed in 1959. From these bodies several denominations separated. Today there are more than 100 Presbyterian churches/denominations in South Korea. In the 21st century, a new General Assembly of the Orthodox Presbyterian Church of Korea (Founder. Ha Seung-moo) in 2012 declared itself an authentic historical succession of Scottish Presbyterian John Knox.

Korean Protestant Faith 
The Korean Protestant belief in God or known as “Hananim”, meaning “God in heaven”. Their conception of the supreme God was presiding over the affairs of heaven and earth, and controlling the fate of humans. Contrary to Shamanism beliefs, which include but are not limited to seeking out a shaman for material wishes, longevity, health, male births and wealth -- Christians believe that God will supply their needs while remaining truthful, obedient and faithful to God. However, Korean Protestants were obligated to incorporate some aspects of shamanistic rituals.

The belief of God also was the creator and sustainer of the universe, who has the power to liberate from suffering, healing, provide salvation or giving consolation. Similarly to Korean Shamanism, shamans were able to cast out evil spirits and cure diseases, just as how the teachings of Jesus Christ has done.

Confessional basis
Westminster Confession of Faith
Westminster Larger Catechism
Westminster Shorter Catechism
Apostles Creed

Korean Presbyterian denominations

Conservative Presbyterian Church in Korea
Conservative Reformed Presbyterian Church in Korea
Fundamentalist Presbyterian General Assembly in Korea
Independent Reformed Church in Korea
Independent Reformed Presbyterian Church in Korea
Korea Jesus Presbyterian Church
Korea Presbyterian Church
Korean Christian Fundamentalist Assembly
Korean Presbyterian Church (GaeHyuk I.)
Korean Presbyterian Church (HoHun)
Myungsung Presbyterian Church
Onnuri Community Church
Orthodox Presbyterian Church of Korea
Presbyterian Church in Korea (BokUm)
Presbyterian Church in Korea (BoSuHapDong II.)
Presbyterian Church in Korea (BoSuHapDong III.)
Presbyterian Church in Korea (BoSuHapDong)
Presbyterian Church in Korea (BoSuJeongTong)
Presbyterian Church in Korea (BoSuTongHap)
Presbyterian Church in Korea (BupTong)
Presbyterian Church in Korea (ChanYang)
Presbyterian Church in Korea (ChongHoe I)
Presbyterian Church in Korea (ChongHoe II)
Presbyterian Church in Korea (ChongHoe II.)
Presbyterian Church in Korea (DaeHanShinChuk)
Presbyterian Church in Korea (DaeShin II)
Presbyterian Church in Korea (DaeShin II.)
Presbyterian Church in Korea (Daeshin)
Presbyterian Church in Korea (DokNoHoe II)
Presbyterian Church in Korea (DokNoHoe)
Presbyterian Church in Korea (DongShin)
Presbyterian Church in Korea (GaeHyuk)
Presbyterian Church in Korea (GaeHyukHapDong I)
Presbyterian Church in Korea (GaeHyukHapDong II)
Presbyterian Church in Korea (GaeHyukHapDong III)
Presbyterian Church in Korea (HanGukBoSu)
Presbyterian Church in Korea (HapDong)
Presbyterian Church in Korea (HapDongBokUm)
Presbyterian Church in Korea (HapDongBoSu I.)
Presbyterian Church in Korea (HapDongBoSu II.)
Presbyterian Church in Korea (HapDongBoSu III.)
Presbyterian Church in Korea (HapDongBoSu IV.)
Presbyterian Church in Korea (HapDongBoSu)
Presbyterian Church in Korea (HapDongChinShin II.)
Presbyterian Church in Korea (HapDongChongHoe)
Presbyterian Church in Korea (HapDongChongShin I.)
Presbyterian Church in Korea (HapDongChongShin)
Presbyterian Church in Korea (HapDongChungYun)
Presbyterian Church in Korea (HapDongChunTong)
Presbyterian Church in Korea (HapDongEunChong)
Presbyterian Church in Korea (HapDongGaeHyuk)
Presbyterian Church in Korea (HapDongHwanWon)
Presbyterian Church in Korea (HapDongJangShin)
Presbyterian Church in Korea (HapDongJeongShin)
Presbyterian Church in Korea (HapDongJinRi)
Presbyterian Church in Korea (HapDongSeongHoe)
Presbyterian Church in Korea (HapDongSeungHoe)
Presbyterian Church in Korea (HapDongTongHap)
Presbyterian Church in Korea (HapDongYeChong I)
Presbyterian Church in Korea (HapDongYeChong)
Presbyterian Church in Korea (HapDongYeSun)
Presbyterian Church in Korea (HapDongYunHap)
Presbyterian Church in Korea (HoHun II)
Presbyterian Church in Korea (HoHun III)
Presbyterian Church in Korea (HwanWon)
Presbyterian Church in Korea (HyukShin)
Presbyterian Church in Korea (JaeGun)
Presbyterian Church in Korea (JangShin)
Presbyterian Church in Korea (JapDongJungAng)
Presbyterian Church in Korea (JeongRip)
Presbyterian Church in Korea (JeongTongChongHap)
Presbyterian Church in Korea (JeongTongGyeSeung)
Presbyterian Church in Korea (JungAng)
Presbyterian Church in Korea (JungRip)
Presbyterian Church in Korea (Ko-Ryu-Anti-Accusation)
Presbyterian Church in Korea (KoRyuPa)
Presbyterian Church in Korea (Koshin)
Presbyterian Church in Korea (Logos)
Presbyterian Church in Korea (NamBuk)
Presbyterian Church in Korea (PyungAhn)
Presbyterian Church in Korea (SungHapChuk)
Presbyterian Church in Korea (SunGyo)
Presbyterian Church in Korea (TongHap)
Presbyterian Church in Korea (TongHapBoSu)
Presbyterian Church in Korea (YeJangHapBo)
Presbyterian Church in Korea (YeJong)
Presbyterian Church in Korea (YunShin)
Presbyterian Church in the Republic of Korea
Pure Presbyterian Church in Korea
SaRang Community Church
Somang Presbyterian Church
Union Presbyterian Church in Korea
United Presbyterian Church in Korea
Women Pastors Presbyterian Church in Korea
Young Nak Presbyterian Church

All of these churches have the same confessional basis the Apostle Creed and the Westminster Confession.

Korean Presbyterians have many outreach programs. Many are very conservative, some are liberal. There are close connections with the United States and Canadian Presbyterian churches.

See also
Christianity in Korea
Presbyterian Church of Korea
Roman Catholicism in South Korea

References